The Pacific Coast Conference (PCC) was a college athletic conference in the United States which existed from 1915 to 1959.  Though the Pac-12 Conference claims the PCC's history as part of its own, with eight of the ten PCC members (including all four original PCC charter members) now in the Pac-12, the older league had a completely different charter and was disbanded in 1959 due to a major crisis and scandal.

Established on December 2, 1915, its four charter members were the University of California (now University of California, Berkeley), the University of Washington, the University of Oregon, and Oregon Agricultural College (now Oregon State University).

Conference members
 University of California, Berkeley (1915–1959)
 University of Oregon (1915–1959)
 Oregon State College (1915–1959)
 University of Washington (1915–1959)
 Washington State College (1917–1959)
 Stanford University (1918–1959)
 University of Idaho (1922–1959)
 University of Southern California (1922–1959, suspended in 1924)
 University of Montana (1924–1950)
 University of California, Los Angeles (1928–1959)

Membership timeline

Before the crisis
Rivalries between the Pacific Coast Conference schools grew beyond athletics, with animosities around educational, financial and state rivalries.  The tensions between the California and Northwest schools extended to Edwin Pauley, a regent of the University of California, disliking the member universities in the Pacific Northwest enough to advocate that the California institutions leave the Pacific Coast Conference to form a "California Conference."

The PCC had a history of being very strict with regards to its standards; it suspended the University of Southern California from the conference in 1924, performed a critical self-study in 1932, and a voluminous two-million-word report was compiled by Edwin Atherton in 1939. The PCC had a paid commissioner, an elaborate constitution, a formal code of conduct, and a system for reporting student-athlete eligibility. Following the submission of his report, Atherton was promptly hired as commissioner in 1940, and served until his death four years later, He was succeeded by his assistant, Victor O. Schmidt.

The conference was wracked by scandal in 1951. Charges were made and confirmed that University of Oregon football coach Jim Aiken had violated the conference code for financial aid and athletic subsidies. After Aiken was compelled to resign, Oregon urged the PCC to look at similar abuses by UCLA football coach Red Sanders. The conference spent five years attempting to reform itself. In 1956, the scandal became public.

The crisis
The scandal first broke at Washington, when in January 1956, several discontented players staged a mutiny against their coach, John Cherberg.  After the coach was fired, the PCC followed up on charges of a slush fund. The PCC found evidence of the prohibited activities of the Greater Washington Advertising Fund run by Roscoe C. "Torchy" Torrance, and in May imposed sanctions.

In March, allegations of prohibited payments made by two booster clubs associated with UCLA, the Bruin Bench and the Young Men's Club of Westwood, were published in Los Angeles newspapers.  UCLA refused for ten weeks to allow PCC officials to proceed in their investigation.  Finally, UCLA admitted that, "all members of the football coaching staff had, for several years, known of the unsanctioned payments to student athletes and had cooperated with the booster club members or officers, who actually administered the program by actually referring student athletes to them for such aid." The scandal thickened as a UCLA alumnus and member of the UCLA athletic advisory board blew the whistle on a secret fund for payments in violation of PCC rules to University of Southern California players, known as the Southern California Educational Foundation. This same alumnus also blew the whistle on Cal's phony work program for athletes known as the San Francisco Gridiron Club, with an extension in the Los Angeles area known as the South Seas Fund.

In 1957, the conference fired Vic Schmidt, the commissioner. He had been tasked with cleaning up the conference, and had imposed sanctions on UCLA, including suspending athletes and prohibiting participation in the Rose Bowl for three years.

Aftershocks and disbandment
The first major reaction came from the University of California system. Robert Sproul, president of the University of California, along with the chancellors of Berkeley and UCLA, drafted a "Five Point Plan", emphasizing academic eligibility standards, setting the two UC campuses apart from the PCC and laying the groundwork for their departure. For Sproul the PCC dispute was not just about athletics; at stake was the ideal of a unified University of California that enjoyed statewide support. This ideal collided with aspirations of UCLA alumni who believed that Sproul's vision would always favor the Berkeley campus at the expense of the younger UCLA campus.

Oregon State College president August Leroy Strand wrote, "The reasons for California and UCLA dropping out are as different as night and day... the significance of the whole affair was the union of Berkeley and UCLA... admissions and scholarship had nothing to do with the withdrawals . . . the marriage of this desire on the part of Berkeley with the known ambitions and necessities of its sister institution has produced a bastard that has the bard of a purebred but the innards and hair of a mongrel."

The PCC was falling apart, leading to the decision to dissolve after the 1958–59 season.

The PCC scandal was one of several problems during the chancellorship of Raymond B. Allen at UCLA that caused him to fall out of favor with the Regents of the University of California.  Allen was widely expected to become the next UC President, but instead, in October 1957, UC Berkeley Chancellor Clark Kerr was the Regents' unanimous choice to succeed Sproul.

New conference (AAWU)

Soon after the PCC was dissolved, five of its nine members (California, Washington, UCLA, Southern California, and Stanford) created the Athletic Association of Western Universities (AAWU) for the 1959 season. While the AAWU did not negotiate an agreement with the Pasadena Tournament of Roses Association to have a standing contractual invitation to the Rose Bowl Game until the following year, the Tournament of Roses did choose to invite the AAWU's inaugural regular season champion to the first post-PCC Rose Bowl.

After initially being blocked from admission, three of the four remaining schools would eventually join (Washington State in 1962, Oregon and Oregon State in 1964), but members were not required to play other members. Tensions were high between UCLA and Stanford, as Stanford had voted for UCLA's expulsion from the PCC.

Idaho was not involved in the scandals but had become noncompetitive in the PCC. Unlike Washington State, Oregon, and Oregon State, Idaho did not pursue AAWU admission, and competed as an independent before becoming a charter member of the Big Sky Conference in 1963. Idaho retains no strong connections to its PCC past other than a continuing rivalry with Washington State; the two land grant campuses are just eight miles (13 km) apart in the Palouse region.

The AAWU eventually strengthened its bonds and added members, renaming itself the Pacific-8 Conference (Pac-8) in 1968. By 1971, most Pac-8 schools played round-robin conference football schedules, and the two Oregon schools were again playing USC and UCLA on a regular basis. The conference added WAC powers Arizona and Arizona State in 1978 and became the Pacific-10 Conference (Pac-10). On July 1, 2011, the conference added Colorado from the Big 12 and Utah from the Mountain West (also a former WAC member) and became the Pac-12.  The Pac-12 claims the PCC's history as its own, though it operates under a separate charter.

Conference  champions
The official record book of conference champions was compiled by the then acting commissioner Bernie Hammerbeck in 1959.

Men's basketball

The Pacific Coast Conference began playing basketball in the 1915–16 season. The PCC adopted a divisional format for basketball beginning with the 1922–23 season. The California schools formed the Southern Division, while the Pacific Northwest and Rocky Mountain schools formed the North Division. The winners of the two divisions played a best of three series to determine the PCC basketball champion. If two division teams tied, they had a one-game playoff to produce the division representative. Starting with the first NCAA tournament in 1939, the winner of the PCC divisional playoff was given the automatic berth in the NCAA tournament. Oregon, the PCC champion that season, won the first NCAA title game.

The last divisional playoff was in the 1954–55 season. After that, all teams played each other in a round robin competition. From the 1955–56 season through the 1958–59 season, the regular season conference champion was awarded the NCAA tournament berth from the PCC. In the case of a tie, a tie breaker rule was used to determine the NCAA tournament representative.

 Bold indicates national champion

Football

^ Denotes PCC representative in Rose Bowl for shared conference championships

Bold denotes national champion recognition

Baseball
The PCC adopted a divisional format for baseball in 1923, with the same alignment that it used for basketball.

*denotes Pacific Coast Conference playoff champion**California won the CIBA Division 1 and USC won CIBA Division 2. California won the whole division title by beating USC in the CIBA playoff

 Bold indicates National Champion

Commissioners
Herb Dana, 193x–1940 
Edwin N. Atherton, 1940–1944 
Victor O. Schmidt, 1944–1959
Bernie Hammerbeck (acting), 1959

See also
List of defunct college football conferences
California Intercollegiate Baseball Association

References

Defunct NCAA Division I conferences
Pac-12 Conference
1915 establishments in the United States
1959 disestablishments in the United States
Sports leagues established in 1915
Sports leagues disestablished in 1959